Ajani Alexander Edward Burchall (born 5 November 2004) is Bermudian professional footballer who plays as a winger for Premier League team Aston Villa. He is a product of the North Village Rams youth team in Hamilton, Bermuda, and was signed by AFC Bournemouth at the age of eleven. He became Bournemouth's third youngest player of all time when he appeared for their senior side as a late substitute in December 2020, he transferred to Aston Villa six months later, joining their academy. He has played internationally at under-15 level for the Bermuda.

Club career

AFC Bournemouth
Burchall was born in Bermuda and joined AFC Bournemouth in 2016 from the youth side of North Village Rams, based near Hamilton, Bermuda. In March 2019, at the age of 14, he signed a pre-scholarship agreement with the club. On 12 December 2020, he made his professional debut in the Championship, coming on as a late substitute in a 5–0 win over Huddersfield Town. The appearance made him Bournemouth's third youngest player of all time.

Aston Villa 
On 9 July 2021, Burchall joined Premier League club Aston Villa for an undisclosed transfer fee. In October 2021, after a positive start for Villa in the U18 Premier League in which he scored three goals, and provided three assists in his first four games, Burchall was named by The Guardian as one of the top young prospects in English football. On 10 November 2021, Burchall was given his first full professional contract by Aston Villa.

In August 2022, Burchall suffered an anterior cruciate ligament injury during a training session - which was expected to rule him out for the whole season.

International career
Burchall has represented Bermuda at under-15 level, playing for them in the 2019 CONCACAF Boys' Under-15 Championship.

Personal life
Burchall grew up in the Paget Parish of Bermuda. He attended Bournemouth Collegiate School.

Career Statistics

References

External links

2004 births
Living people
Bermudian footballers
Bermuda youth international footballers
Association football wingers
English Football League players
AFC Bournemouth players
Aston Villa F.C. players
Bermudian expatriate footballers
Expatriate footballers in England
Bermudian expatriate sportspeople in England